Gaspard Bobek (1593–1635) was a Roman Catholic prelate who served as Bishop of Pedena (1631–1635).

Biography
Gaspard Bobek was born in Raduliza in 1593. On 7 April 1631, he was appointed during the papacy of Pope Urban VIII as Bishop of Pedena. He served as Bishop of Pedena until his death in 1635.

See also 
Catholic Church in Croatia

References 

17th-century Roman Catholic bishops in Croatia
Bishops appointed by Pope Urban VIII
1593 births
1635 deaths